Kwamé the Boy Genius: Featuring a New Beginning is the debut studio album from American hip hop artist Kwamé, released on January 31, 1989, on Atlantic Records.

The album peaked at number 114 on the Billboard 200 chart.

Release and reception

The album peaked at 114 on the U.S. Billboard 200 and reached the thirteenth spot on the R&B Albums chart.

Steve Huey at Allmusic called the album's production "bright, appealing, and funky," and remarked that Kwamé himself was "a sorely neglected figure today, even among fans of playful, intellectual hip-hop."

Track listing

Chart history

Album

Singles

"—" denotes releases that did not chart.

Personnel
Information taken from Allmusic.
art direction – Bob Defrin
choir – B. Flat, Curt D.I.S.S., M.A.D. Scratches, The Sharp, Speaker of the House
chorus – B. Flat, Curt D.I.S.S., M.A.D. Scratches, The Sharp, Speaker of the House
design – Lynn Kowalewski
engineering – Andre Debourg
mastering – Dennis King
performer – New Beginning
photography – Robert Manella
production – Hurby "Luv Bug" Azor, The Invincibles
vocals – B. Flat, Curt D.I.S.S., M.A.D. Scratches, The Sharp, Allan Sharp, Speaker of the House
vocals (background) – Angela White, Jimmy Young

Notes

External links
 
 Kwamé the Boy Genius: Featuring a New Beginning at Discogs

1989 debut albums
Atlantic Records albums
Kwamé albums
Albums produced by Hurby Azor